The Battle of Torata is part of the Peruvian War of Independence, which occurred on January 19, 1823 in the high Torata (town located northeast of Moquegua) between the Liberation Army of Peru, under command of Argentinean General Rudecindo Alvarado, and Royal Army of Peru under Gen. Brigadier Jerónimo Valdés and culminated with the defeat of patriots whose army would be completely destroyed two days later at the Battle of Moquegua with support of Gen José de Canterac.

References
Memoirs of general Miller, in the service of the republic of Peru,1828. Volumen 2,Chap XVII,p 20

Torata
Torata
January 1823 events
1823 in Peru
Conflicts in 1823
History of Moquegua Region